The 1967 European Formula Two season was the 1st FIA European Formula Two Championship. It commenced on 24 March 1967 and ended on 8 October after ten races. Jacky Ickx won the Championship after winning the last race in Vallelunga, but the most successful driver of the season was Jochen Rindt, who won five Championship races but, as a graded driver, he was ineligible to earn points, so Ickx won the Championship. Other graded drivers, like Jim Clark and Jackie Stewart, also each won races.

Teams and drivers

 Pink background denotes graded drivers

Results and standings

Races

Drivers
Note: Graded drivers, e.g. Jochen Rindt, were ineligible to score points.

Points distribution was:
First place: 9 points
Second place: 6 points
Third place: 4 points
Fourth place: 3 points
Fifth place: 2 points
Sixth place: 1 point

Non-Championship race results
Other Formula Two races, which did not count towards the European Championship, also held in 1967.

‡ – Joint F1/F2 races. F2 winners shown.

References

European Formula Two Championship seasons
European Formula two season